Fruit whips are desserts made from puréed fruit and whipped egg whites. They are usually uncooked, but some variants are cooked; they may be served plain, or with a sauce of fruit juice, custard, or cream, and possibly over a sponge cake or ladyfingers.

The uncooked variants are similar to mousse, while the cooked variants are similar to soufflé. There are also variants using whole eggs, gelatin, or farina.

A common kind of fruit whip is prune whip, but almost any raw, dried, or cooked fruit may be used, mashed or sieved, for example apple, strawberry, raspberry, apricot, cherry, fig, pineapple, or rhubarb.

Fruit whips are normally made by whipping the egg white then mixing in the puréed and sweetened fruit pulp. Some modern recipes call for using a blender.

See also

 List of desserts

References

External links
Cream Whippers

Fruit dishes
Desserts